Wang Chengbin (August 21, 1874 – February 15, 1936) was an ethnic Manchu Chinese general of the Warlord Era of the Republic of China. He was the father of Hong Kong cartoonist Alfonso Wong. Born in Fengtian (now Liaoning) Province, Wang attended Baoding Military Academy from 1907–09, and shortly thereafter joined the New Army and was stationed in Changchun, Jilin Province. In October 1911, after the outbreak of the Wuchang Uprising, he was sent to Shanxi Province to suppress supporters of the Xinhai Revolution. In August 1912, he was appointed commander of the 11th Regiment, part of the 6th Brigade, 3rd Division. In the fall of 1913, he went with the 3rd Division to Yuezhou (now Yueyang in Hunan) to suppress the Second Revolution. In 1915, he went with the 3rd Division to Sichuan Province to suppress opposition to the Empire of China. In July 1917, he acted with Wu Peifu to overthrow Zhang Xun's Manchu Restoration.

External links
 Wang Chen-ping (Wang Chengbin) 王承斌 from Biographies of Prominent Chinese c.1925.

1874 births
1936 deaths
Republic of China warlords from Liaoning
Manchu politicians
Politicians from Huludao